Systerflesene Islands is a group of three small islands lying 5 miles (8 km) west of Hamnenabben Head in the east part of Lutzow-Holm Bay. Mapped by Norwegian cartographers from air photos taken by the Lars Christensen Expedition, 1936–37, and named "Systerflesene" (the sister islets).

See also 
 List of antarctic and sub-antarctic islands

Islands of Queen Maud Land
Prince Harald Coast